The nacunda nighthawk (Chordeiles nacunda) is a species of nightjar in the family Caprimulgidae. It is found in Argentina, Bolivia, Brazil, Chile, Colombia, Ecuador, French Guiana, Guyana, Paraguay, Peru, Suriname, Trinidad and Tobago, Uruguay, and Venezuela. Its natural habitats are dry savanna, subtropical or tropical seasonally wet or flooded lowland grassland, and heavily degraded former forest.

Taxonomy
The species was formerly placed in the monotypic genus Podager, but was reclassified into the genus Chordeiles in 2011. The former generic name podager originates from the Latin meaning "a man suffering from gout" and reflects the awkward walking manner of this nighthawk. The specific name nacunda is derived from the Guaraní word for a "big-mouth".

Description

The nacunda nighthawk is not only the largest of the highly aerial nightjars known as nighthawks and the largest species of nightjar in the neotropics, it is one of the largest species in the world. Its very large size, large head, and pale body with highly contrasting black primaries make the nacunda nighthawk easy to identify.

This species is noteworthy for its partially diurnal habits. Though a capable aerial forager, the nacunda nighthawk spends a considerable amount of time on the ground; it has notably long tarsi for a nightjar, and is more likely than other species to be seen standing on the ground, rather than resting on the surface.

References

External links

 Photo of nacunda nighthawk
 IBC.lynxeds.com

nacunda nighthawk
Birds of the Caribbean
Birds of Trinidad and Tobago
Birds of South America
nacunda nighthawk
Taxa named by Louis Jean Pierre Vieillot
Taxonomy articles created by Polbot